The 2023 Nigerian Senate elections in Edo State will be held on 25 February 2023, to elect the 3 federal Senators from Edo State, one from each of the state's three senatorial districts. The elections will coincide with the 2023 presidential election, as well as other elections to the Senate and elections to the House of Representatives; with state elections being held two weeks later. Primaries were held between 4 April and 9 June 2022.

Background
In terms of the previous Senate elections, all three incumbent senators were re-elected: Clifford Ordia (PDP) held his seat with 53% of the vote in the Central district, Francis Alimikhena (APC) won with 59% in the North district, and Matthew Urhoghide was returned with 51% in the South district. These results were a showcase of Edo State's electoral competitiveness as the APC won slightly more House of Representatives seats than the PDP and a sizeable APC majority was elected to the House of Assembly but PDP nominee Atiku Abubakar narrowly carried the state in the presidential election. Over a year after the senatorial elections was the state's gubernatorial election where incumbent Governor Godwin Obaseki (APC-turned-PDP) was re-elected under the banner of his new party.

Later in the term, Ordia and Urhoghide sided with Obaseki in the battle over control of the Edo PDP and took part in his faction's primaries for 2023. Alimikhena left the APC in May 2022 and joined the PDP, also siding with the Obaseki-aligned faction.

Overview

Summary

Edo Central 

The Edo Central Senatorial District covers the local government areas of Esan Central, Esan North-East, Esan South-East, Esan West, and Igueben; it largely corresponds with the Esan cultural area of Esanland. The incumbent Clifford Ordia (PDP), who was re-elected with 52.9% of the vote in 2019, is seeking re-election.

Primary elections

All Progressives Congress 

On the primary date, Monday Okpebholo was the sole candidate and was nominated unopposed.

People's Democratic Party 

In the year before the primaries, the Edo State PDP split between two factions: one group led by incumbent Governor Godwin Obaseki and his allies who joined the PDP with him in 2020 with a rival bloc led by the national PDP South-South Deputy National Vice-Chairman Dan Orbih and longtime party members. The dispute escalated in late 2021 when the Obaseki-aligned state PDP leadership attempted to suspend Orbih's membership and the two factions held separate party congresses. Despite a court order that recognised the Orbih faction a few days before the primary date, both factions held separate primaries with longtime party members mainly winning the Orbih factional primaries and recent defectors mainly winning the Obaseki factional primaries.

In the Orbih-aligned factional primary, former Minister of Works Mike Onolememen emerged victorious over former MHR Friday Obomezele Itulah by a large margin. In the Obaseki-aligned factional primary, Ordia also defeated Itulah in a landslide. In INEC's final list of nominees in September, the Orbih faction's nominees were recognized due to the previous court order; however, Federal High Court promptly ordered the recognition of the Obaseki faction's nominees before the Supreme Court dismissed an appeal by Orbih’s faction. However, it was not until 2 February 2023 that the apex court definitivelu ruled on the matter, again siding with the Obaseki faction.

Campaign
By the start of the official campaign period in October, Okpebholo supporters began to use the PDP crisis to campaign with claims that the ongoing litigation could deprive the district of representation if the PDP won the seat but litigation continued.

General election

Results

Edo North 

The Edo North Senatorial District covers the local government areas of Akoko Edo, Etsako Central, Etsako East, Etsako West, Owan East, and Owan West. The incumbent Francis Alimikhena (PDP) was re-elected with 59.0% of the vote in 2019 as a member of the APC; he initially sought renomination in the APC before withdrawing from the primary and defecting to win the PDP nomination in June 2022.

Primary elections

All Progressives Congress 

About two months before the primary date, Alimikhena declared for re-election but former Edo State Governor and former APC National Chairman Adams Oshiomhole also announced that he would run for the seat; however, Oshiomhole also declared his campaign for president around the same time. Despite calls from pro-Alimikhena groups for Oshiomhole to continue his presidential campaign, he dropped the presidential campaign in mid-May causing Alimikhena to withdraw from the senatorial primary and leave the APC. At the primary in Auchi, Oshiomhole won easily and said afterwards that he "will ensure that the voice of Edo North will be loud and clear" in the Senate and called on Alimikhena to accept the primary.

People's Democratic Party 

In the Orbih-aligned factional primary, Pascal Ugbome—a former member of the Edo State House of Assembly—defeated runner-up Tony Ezekiel by a 47% margin. In the original Obaseki-aligned factional primary, Victoria Edelokun defeated Ugbome by an even greater margin but she withdrew from the nomination a few days later. The Obaseki factional PDP leadership called a new primary for 4 June in Auchi which the newly defected Alimikhena won by a 94% margin. Afterwards, Ugbome protested to the media and repeated his claim to be the legitimate PDP nominee. In INEC's final list of nominees in September, the Orbih faction's nominees were recognized due to the previous court order; however, Federal High Court promptly ordered the recognition of the Obaseki faction's nominees before the Supreme Court dismissed an appeal by Orbih’s faction. However, it was not until 2 February 2023 that the apex court definitivelu ruled on the matter, again siding with the Obaseki faction.

Campaign
In a January 2023 campaign analysis piece, reporters from The Punch labeled Oshiomhole as the frontrunner due to his longtime electoral influence in the region. However, the report also noted Alimikhena's incumbency advantage along with how the rise of Peter Obi's presidential candidacy could boost Anselm Eragbe—the LP senatorial nominee. In the week before the election, the Daily Post noted that despite Oshiomhole and APC strength in the district, both the LP and PDP were genuine electoral threats (especially amid the naira scarcity crisis).

General election

Results

Edo South 

The Edo South Senatorial District covers the local government areas of Egor, Ikpoba Okha, Oredo, Orhionmwon, Ovia North-East, Ovia South-West, and Uhunmwonde. The incumbent Matthew Urhoghide (PDP), who was re-elected with 51.0% of the vote in 2019, sought re-election but was defeated in the PDP primary.

Primary elections

All Progressives Congress 

The primary, which was held in a sports hall at the University of Benin in Benin City, resulted in Valentine Asuen's nomination. Asuen—a businessman, former APC official, and Oredo local government councilor—defeated former Deputy Governor Lucky Imasuen.

People's Democratic Party 

In the Orbih-aligned factional primary, Omoregie Ogbeide-Ihama—member of the House of Representatives for Oredo—was nominated unanimously but the primary was marred by three events: the shooting of a Orbih-aligned PDP ward chairman, an attack on the primary venue by allegedly Obaseki-supporting thugs, and the arrest of four journalists by police for covering an "illegal" primary. In the Obaseki-aligned factional primary at the Samuel Ogbemudia Stadium, incumbent Urhoghide was defeated by Matthew Iduoriyekemwen—former member of the Edo State House of Assembly—in a narrow race; Urhoghide promptly walked out of the venue. In INEC's final list of nominees in September, the Orbih faction's nominees were recognized due to the previous court order; however, Federal High Court promptly ordered the recognition of the Obaseki faction's nominees before the Supreme Court dismissed an appeal by Orbih’s faction. However, it was not until 2 February 2023 that the apex court definitivelu ruled on the matter, again siding with the Obaseki faction.

General election

Results

See also 
 2023 Nigerian Senate election
 2023 Nigerian elections

Notes

References 

Edo State senatorial elections
2023 Edo State elections
Edo State Senate elections